David Slagger (born June 22, 1962) is a Native American politician in Maine. Slagger served as a member of the Maine House of Representatives, representing the newly recognized Maliseet Tribe. Slagger was sworn-in as the appointed representative to the House of Representatives on January 4, 2012. He held the seat temporarily until a tribal election could be conducted to elect a Maliseet Tribal Representative, which the Maliseet Tribe then did on December 22, 2012 when tribal members elected Henry John Bear as their first elected Tribal Representative to the Maine House of Representatives. Slagger did not seek another term as Maliseet representative.

Slagger was one of three non-voting representatives from Maine's Native American tribes in the House of Representatives. Representatives from each tribe are all elected by tribal members.

Slagger did not seek another term as the Maliseet representative due to the limitations placed on tribal representatives, including the inability to vote and sponsor bills without co-sponsors. Slagger was humiliated when, during a tie vote in the Labor, Commerce, Research and Economic Development Committee on which he sat, Slagger's deciding vote was recorded but cast aside by the committee chair. In May 2012, Slagger announced a bid for the non-tribal seat in which he lived, District 22. Still running as a non-party (independent) candidate, he challenged incumbent Republican incumbent Stacy Guerin with no Democrat in the race. He received 1,299 votes (26%) and lost.

Gubernatorial campaign
In February 2013, Slagger formed a campaign committee to run for Governor of Maine in 2014 as a Democrat. In April, Slagger enrolled as a Green Independent and began seeking the Maine Green Independent Party's nomination. Shortly thereafter, Slagger unenrolled as a Green Independent and continued his run as an unenrolled candidate for Governor. Slagger did not qualify for the November 2014 ballot as an independent.

Personal
Slagger grew up in Aroostook County, Maine and lives in Kenduskeag in Penobscot County with his wife (a Mi'kmaq) and their three children. In September 2005, Slagger, a non-traditional undergraduate at the University of Maine, was awarded an internship at the Smithsonian Institution's National Museum of the American Indian in Washington, D.C. At the time of his swearing-in in 2012, Slagger was a doctoral candidate at the University of Maine.

References

1962 births
Living people
Maliseet people
Members of the Maine House of Representatives
People from Kenduskeag, Maine
University of Maine alumni
Native American state legislators in Maine
Maine Independents
Native American people from Maine